The Sungod Recreation Centre is a recreation centre located in Delta, British Columbia. The facility contains 4 pools, a swirl pool, a sauna, a steam room, a weight room, an aerobic studio, and an ice rink. It also hosts swimming lessons including kids, teens, and lifeguard courses.

Mechanical Systems

Original system with pool opening Fall 1977
Two Hi Rate Sand Filters one for each pool, main and teaching pool.
Strantrol automated pool chemistry monitoring and adjustment.
Gas chlorine delivery system.
Natural Gas Boiler

Pool Design

T-shaped 25m x 25 m, 8 Lanes each way.
3 m and 1 m springboards.

External links
The Corporation of Delta
Sungod Recreation Centre info

Indoor arenas in British Columbia
Indoor ice hockey venues in Canada
Sports venues in British Columbia
Buildings and structures in Delta, British Columbia